The 2015 St. George Illawarra Dragons season is the 17th in the joint venture club's history. Coached by Paul McGregor, and captained by Ben Creagh, they compete in the NRL's 2015 Telstra Premiership season.

Squad movement

Gains

Losses

Ladder

Fixtures

NRL Auckland Nines

The NRL Auckland Nines is a pre-season rugby league nines competition featuring all 16 NRL clubs. The 2015 competition was played over two days on 31 January and 1 February at Eden Park. The Dragons feature in the Rangitoto pool and played the Parramatta Eels, Newcastle Knights and Manly Warringah Sea Eagles.

Regular season

Finals

Players

Source=

References

St. George Illawarra Dragons seasons
St. George Illawarra Dragons season